Henry Wright may refer to:
Henry Clarke Wright (1797–1870), American abolitionist
Henry Wright (artist) (1849–1937), English artist and war correspondent 
Henry Wright (civil servant) (1794–1879), Accountant General and Controller of Revenue of Ceylon, 1841–1847.
Henry Smith Wright (1839–1910), British Member of Parliament for Nottingham South, 1886–1895
Henry Parks Wright (1839–1918), Yale's first college dean
Henry W. Wright (1868–1948), American politician from California
H. FitzHerbert Wright (1870–1947), British politician
Henry Burt Wright (1877–1923), theology professor at Yale University, son of Henry Parks Wright, above
Henry Wright (planner) (1878–1936), American urban planner and architect
Henry Oswald Wright (1880–1963), rancher and political figure in Saskatchewan, Canada
Henry Wright (footballer) (1882–1953), Australian footballer
Henry Wright (baseball) (1906–?), American Negro leagues baseball player
Henry T. Wright, American anthropologist and archaeologist
Sir Henry Wright, 1st Baronet (c. 1637–1664), member of parliament for Harwich
Henry Wright (Massachusetts politician), early Massachusetts settler

See also
Harry Wright (disambiguation)